Duplex scanning is a feature of some computer scanners, and multifunction printers (MFPs) that support duplex printing. A duplex scanner can automatically scan a sheet of paper on both sides. Scanners without this capability can only scan both sides of a sheet of paper by reinserting it manually the other way up.

Duplex scanning is usually implemented on multifunction printers using a Reversing Automatic Document Feeder (RADF), which removes, reverses, and re-feeds the document after scanning one side. Duplex scanning is achieved on scanners by either RADF or by single pass duplex scanning using two cameras, one for each side of document; two-camera scanners scan twice as fast as a similar two-pass scanner.

Typical duplex scanners

The following table compares features for a number of duplex scanners, mostly discontinued as of 2015:

References 

Computing input devices